Nicolás D'Agostino (born November 24, 1982 in Buenos Aires, Argentina) is an Argentinean actor, well-known for playing Tony, the grandson of Rosa in the Argentinean soap-opera Sos mi vida.

He appeared in spectacles: The best country in the world (El mejor país del mundo) in Teatro Maipo, Amanda and Eduardo (Amanda y Eduardo) in Teatro General San Martín, (¿Por qué ciegos?), The demonstration of the love of boys (El show de the los chicos enamorados) and Alan and Leo (Alan y El León).

Filmography

Soap operas 
 2010 Sueña Conmigo-as Joaco
 2007 Patito feo- as Francisco Chicho Ginóbili / Eugenio Barcarolli
 2006 Sos mi vida- as Tony
 2005 ½ falta- as Miguel
 2005 Paraíso Rock- as Vito
 2004 Laura's Secret (Culpable de este amor)- as Geal
 1997 chiquititas- as Lalo

Movies 
 2003: Un Día en el paraíso
 1997: Dibu: La película

External links 
 
 Official Site

1982 births
Argentine male actors
Living people
People from Buenos Aires